Croydon Harriers is an athletics club based in Croydon, England. It was founded in 1920 and is located at Croydon Sports Arena.

Notable athletes

Olympians

External links
 Official website

Athletics clubs in London
Sport in the London Borough of Croydon
1920 establishments in England